Abigél Joó (born 6 August 1990 in Budapest, Hungary) is a Hungarian judoka.

Joó won the 2010 European Championships in the -78 kg event, and regained her title in 2012.  Since then, she has won three bronze medals in 2013, 2014 and 2017.  As a junior, she had won bronze medals at the world junior championships in 2008 and 2009, in the 70 kg division.  At European level, she won the European junior title at -70 kg in 2008 and 2009, having won the bronze medal in 2007 in the -63 kg division.  She also won four European under-23 titles.

She competed at the 2012 Summer Olympics in the -78 kg event.  She beat Audrey Koumba in her first match, before losing to Kayla Harrison.  As Harrison reached the final, Joó was entered into the repechage.  In the repechage, she beat Daria Pogorzelec before losing her bronze medal match to Audrey Tcheuméo.  During her match against Harrison, Joó tore knee ligaments, restricting her performance.

Joó competed in the same division at the 2016 Summer Olympics.  She won her first match against Pürevjargalyn Lkhamdegd, then beat Mami Umeki before losing to Harrison in quarterfinals.  Because Harrison again reached the final, Joó was entered into the repechage, where she lost her first repechage match to Yalennis Castillo.

In 2017, she married shortly after the European championships and is now sometimes under the name of Abigél Erdelyi-Joo.  In 2017, she also won her ninth Hungarian national title.

References

External links
 
 
 
 

1990 births
Living people
Hungarian female judoka
Olympic judoka of Hungary
Judoka at the 2012 Summer Olympics
Judoka at the 2016 Summer Olympics
Martial artists from Budapest
Universiade medalists in judo
Universiade gold medalists for Hungary
European Games competitors for Hungary
Judoka at the 2015 European Games
Medalists at the 2013 Summer Universiade
20th-century Hungarian women
21st-century Hungarian women